Johan Carlsson (born 1 August 1981) is a Swedish football player who has played for SIFFK. He has made 68 Veikkausliiga appearances for IFK Mariehamn and scored one goal.

References
Guardian Football

1981 births
Living people
Swedish footballers
Swedish expatriate footballers
Expatriate footballers in Finland
Veikkausliiga players
IFK Mariehamn players
Association football midfielders
Footballers from Stockholm